John Malinosky (born May 8, 1955, in Vancouver, British Columbia) is a former professional Canadian football offensive lineman who played ten seasons in the Canadian Football League for four teams.

High school and college years
After playing first at Killarney Secondary School John completed his high school ball at Notre Dame Regional Secondary School, both located in East Vancouver.  He played college football at the  Michigan State University.

Professional career
Malinosky was traded from the Winnipeg Blue Bombers to the Toronto Argonauts in 1980 as part of a 6-man deal.

References

1955 births
Living people
Canadian football people from Vancouver
Players of Canadian football from British Columbia
Canadian football offensive linemen
Calgary Stampeders players
Winnipeg Blue Bombers players
Toronto Argonauts players
Hamilton Tiger-Cats players
Michigan State Spartans football players